Rinkeby metro station is a station on the blue line of the Stockholm metro, located in the district of Rinkeby. The station was opened on 31 August 1975 as part the first stretch of the Blue Line between T-Centralen and Hjulsta. The trains were running to Hallonbergen and then to Rinkeby via a track which is currently used for the rail yard access.

References

External links
Images of Rinkeby

Blue line (Stockholm metro) stations
Railway stations opened in 1975
1975 establishments in Sweden